Double Trouble is an Australian children's comedy-drama television series aired on the Nine Network and repeated on ABC3. It was produced by the Central Australian Aboriginal Media Association. Double Trouble is the remake of the 1984 American series of the same name and is based on the popular comic strip Cheeverwood written and drawn by Michael Fry, syndicated by The Washington Post Writers Group. The program is currently being syndicated in the United States on Vibrant TV Network.

Premise
A set of identical twin Aboriginal girls separated at birth accidentally meet up 15 years later in Alice Springs.  The inspiration for it was the comic strip Cheeverwood by Michael Fry. Yuma has been brought up in the bright lights of Sydney with her European-Australian father, and Kyanna has grown up in a remote traditional Aboriginal community in Central Australia with her mother. They concoct a scheme to switch places in order to meet their other family, and when Yuma's father decides to leave early, Kyanna gets taken back to Sydney as Yuma, and Yuma stays in Alice Springs as Kyanna. However, due to their desire to protect their mother from an Aboriginal stigma associated with women who give birth to twins, the girls decide not to reveal to their respective families and communities who they really are, and devise a way to swap back to their original families.

Cast and characters
 Cassandra Glenn as Yuma
 Christine Glenn as Kyanna
 Lisa Flanagan as Freda
 Myles Pollard as Henry
 Aaron Pedersen as Kelton
 Basia A'Hern as Sasha
 Sam Parsonson as Max
 James Fraser as Heath
 Lillian Crombie as Milly
 Jenny Apostolou as Roz
 Tom E Lewis as Jimmy
 Tyrone Wallace as Aaron
 Letitia Bartlett as Iona
 Marcella Remedio as Lavinia

Episodes

References

External links
Double Trouble at IMDb
Double Trouble at Australian Screen Online

Nine Network original programming
Australian children's television series
Television shows set in the Northern Territory
Television shows set in Sydney
2008 Australian television series debuts
2008 Australian television series endings
Australian comedy-drama television series
Indigenous Australian television series